Sirsha is a village development committee in Dadeldhura District in the Mahakali Zone of western Nepal. The 1991 Nepal census noted a population of 7878 people living in 1269 individual households.

References

External links
UN map of the municipalities of  Dadeldhura District

Populated places in Dadeldhura District